The UML profile for Enterprise Distributed Object Computing (EDOC) is a standard of the Object Management Group in support of open distributed computing using model-driven architecture and service-oriented architecture.  Its aim is to simplify the development of component based (EDOC) systems by providing a UML-based modeling framework conforming to the MDA of the OMG.

The basis of EDOC is the Enterprise Collaboration Architecture, ECA, meta model that defines how roles interact within communities in the performance of collaborative business processes.

The seven EDOC specifications
EDOC is composed of seven specifications:
 The Enterprise Collaboration Architecture, ECA
 The Metamodel and UML Profile for Java and EJB
 The Flow Composition Model, FCM
 The UML Profile for Patterns
 The UML Profile for ECA
 The UML Profile for Meta Object Facility
 The UML Profile for Relationships

See also
 Model Driven Engineering (MDE)
 Model-driven architecture (MDA)
 Meta-model
 Meta-modeling
 Meta-Object Facility (MOF)
 Unified Modeling Language (UML)

External links
 OMG EDOC Standard at the Internet Archive

Unified Modeling Language
Year of introduction missing